The 2021 Swiss same-sex marriage referendum was a facultative referendum held in Switzerland on 26 September 2021 about an amendment to the Civil Code to legalise marriage between persons of the same sex, as well as adoption rights for same-sex couples and access to assisted reproductive technology for lesbian couples. The amendment was called "marriage for all" (Ehe für alle, Mariage pour tous, Matrimonio per tutti, Lètg per tuts) in Swiss public discourse.

64.1% of voters and all cantons supported the amendment, which entered into force on 1 July 2022. The vote made Switzerland the 29th country to legalise same-sex marriage. When the vote took place, Switzerland was one of few countries in Western Europe yet to grant same-sex couples the right to marry.

Purpose 

The amendment subject to the referendum legalises same-sex marriage in Switzerland, adoption by same-sex couples and assisted reproductive technology for female same-sex couples. It leaves in place the option for same-sex-couples to enter into a registered partnership, as introduced into Swiss law in 2005.

History 
Switzerland allows its citizens to launch a facultative referendum to contest a law adopted by the Swiss Federal Assembly, the federal parliament. In order to qualify, the petition must have at least 50,000 signatures within 100 days after the publication of the new law in the Federal Gazette. The evangelical Christian party Federal Democratic Union of Switzerland (EDU) had already announced in June 2020 that they would launch a referendum against the legalisation of same-sex marriage.

After lengthy discussions, initiated by a 2013 bill by the Green Liberal Party of Switzerland, the Federal Assembly adopted a bill for the legalisation of same-sex marriage in 2020. It was supported by the federal government and all political parties, except most of the right-wing Swiss People's Party, about half of the Centre party, and the EDU. The amendment to the Civil Code was published in the Federal Gazette on 31 December 2020, leaving opponents to collect signatures against the law until 10 April 2021.

There were three referendum committees. The first, by the EDU, called itself "No to marriage for all". The second, by members of parliament from the Swiss People's Party (SVP), the Centre and the Evangelical People's Party of Switzerland was called "No to sperm donation for same-sex couples". A third committee called "No to the commodification of children" was launched by members of parliament of the SVP from the Canton of Valais; they also called themselves "For the Family Foundation".

On 12 April 2021, opponents of same-sex marriage announced that they had collected 59,176 certified signatures and brought them to the Federal Chancellery. On 27 April, the Chancellery certified 61,027 valid signatures, which meant that the law would be submitted to a vote. On 19 May, the Federal Council decided that the referendum would take place on 26 September 2021.

In the discussions leading up to the vote, the proponents of equal marriage including the federal minister of justice, Karin Keller-Sutter, highlighted the need to end discrimination and inequality; they said that the law would be a step towards ending the stigmatization and social discrimination against same-sex couples. The opponents of the amendment, primarily from conservative circles, advanced the argument of respecting tradition; they also said that changing the definition of marriage would need a constitutional rather than statutory amendment. But their principal arguments related to child welfare, such as the right of a child to know one's father, which they said would be in jeopardy for the children of female same-sex couples.

Opinion polls 
Polls in advance of the referendum consistently showed roughly two-thirds support for the law.

Results 
64.10% of voters and all cantons supported the amendment to the Civil Code to legalise same-sex marriage.

Reactions

Support 
Laura Russo, co-president of the Geneva Federation of LGBT Associations, said, "This is a historic day for us and for Switzerland, this is a great step forward, something we have been waiting for for years." Pink Cross, a Swiss LGBT umbrella organization, praised the vote and called it a "big milestone".

In a press release after the vote, the Umbrella Association of Rainbow Families wrote about the effects of opposition to marriage equality on its members.

Opposition 
Verena Herzog, The SVP's national councilor, criticized the law for "[opening] the floodgates to many potentially dangerous practices." Speaking to Keystone-SDA, Monika Rüegger of the SVP said it was a "black day" in response to the vote.

References 

Same-sex marriage referendums
2021 in Switzerland
Referendums in Switzerland
Swiss same-sex marriage
LGBT rights in Switzerland
2021 in LGBT history